Dictyophara is the type genus of planthoppers belonging to the family Dictyopharidae and tribe Dictyopharini, containing five subgenera. The scientific genus name Dictyophara derives from the Greek (dictyon: net and phorein: wear) and can be translated "who wears a net".

Species 
FLOW lists the following, from Africa, Europe, Asia and Australia:
Dictyophara (Ancylocrius) Emeljanov, 2003 (Middle East)
 Dictyophara albata Dlabola & Heller, 1962
 Dictyophara exoptata Dlabola & Heller, 1962
 Dictyophara nizipa Dlabola, 1986
 Dictyophara tanghigaruha Dlabola, 1957

Dictyophara (Chanithus) Kolenati, 1857
 Dictyophara avocetta Oshanin, 1879
 Dictyophara compacta Linnavuori, 1962
 Dictyophara eifeliana Dlabola, 1994
 Dictyophara infumata (de Bergevin, 1916)
 Dictyophara longirostris Walker, 1851
 Dictyophara merjensis Linnavuori, 1965
 Dictyophara pales Linnavuori, 1970
 Dictyophara pannonica (Germar, 1830)
 Dictyophara scolopax Oshanin, 1879
 Dictyophara validicornis (Stål, 1859)
 Dictyophara xiphias Puton, 1884

Dictyophara (Conopenchus) Emeljanov, 2003
 Dictyophara lodosi (Dlabola, 1979)
 Dictyophara pales Linnavuori, 1970
 Dictyophara pazukii (Dlabola, 1984)

Dictyophara (Dictyophara) Germar, 1833 
 Dictyophara eremica Linnavuori, 1962
 Dictyophara europaea (Linné, 1767) - type species (synonym D. asiatica Melichar, 1912)
 Dictyophara lindbergi Metcalf, 1955
 Dictyophara subsimilis Linnavuori, 1953

Dictyophara (Euthremma) Emeljanov, 2003
 Dictyophara anatina Puton, 1890
 Dictyophara bergevini Metcalf, 1946
 Dictyophara curvata Matsumura, 1910
 Dictyophara hoberlandti Dlabola, 1974
 Dictyophara lallemandi de Bergevin, 1921
 Dictyophara multireticulata Mulsant & Rey, 1855
 Dictyophara multireticulata sulphuricollis Rey, 1894
 Dictyophara obtusiceps Lethierry, 1889

 subgenus not determined

 Dictyophara abrupta Shakila, 1984
 Dictyophara affinis Spinola, 1839
 Dictyophara afghana Dlabola, 1986
 Dictyophara amaranthusae Shakila, 1984
 Dictyophara anwari Shakila, 1984
 Dictyophara asperae Shakila, 1984
 Dictyophara balakotensis Shakila, 1984
 Dictyophara borneides (Kirkaldy, 1913)
 Dictyophara bovina (Stål, 1862)
 Dictyophara cephalolineata Shakila, 1984
 Dictyophara cephalorobusta Shakila, 1984
 Dictyophara concolor Walker, 1851
 Dictyophara confusa (Stål, 1862)
 Dictyophara constricta Shakila, 1984
 Dictyophara cribrata Walker, 1870
 Dictyophara cyrnea Spinola, 1839
 Dictyophara distincta Melichar, 1912
 Dictyophara fangigharuha Dlabola, 1957
 Dictyophara flavicostata Jacobi, 1943
 Dictyophara frontalis Melichar, 1912
 Dictyophara glaucides (Kirkaldy, 1913)
 Dictyophara greeni Shakila, 1984
 Dictyophara herbida Walker, 1851
 Dictyophara inscia Walker, 1858
 Dictyophara iracina Dlabola, 1989
 Dictyophara karachiensis Shakila, 1984
 Dictyophara koreana Matsumura, 1915
 Dictyophara kotoshonis Matsumura, 1940
 Dictyophara lobosa Shakila, 1984
 Dictyophara longirostrata Kato, 1933
 Dictyophara lyallpurensis Shakila, 1984
 Dictyophara macaonica (Kirkaldy, 1913)
 Dictyophara manchurica (Kato, 1932)
 Dictyophara mianiensis Shakila, 1984
 Dictyophara minuta Shakila, 1984
 Dictyophara misionensis Jensen-Haarup, 1920
 Dictyophara nekkana Matsumura, 1940
 Dictyophara nigrimacula Walker, 1851
 Dictyophara nigromaculata Walker, 1851
 Dictyophara nigrovittata Matsumura, 1913
 Dictyophara nilgiriensis Distant, 1906
 Dictyophara okinawensis Matsumura, 1906
 Dictyophara orangica Shakila, 1984
 Dictyophara ornata Lallemand, 1942
 Dictyophara pakistana Dlabola, 1986
 Dictyophara palisoti Metcalf, 1946
 Dictyophara pallida Walker, 1851
 Dictyophara peshawarensis Shakila, 1984
 Dictyophara picta Walker, 1858
 Dictyophara pirawalensis Shakila, 1984
 Dictyophara prasina Melichar, 1912
 Dictyophara qummari Shakila, 1984
 Dictyophara sacchari Shakila, 1984
 Dictyophara sativae Shakila, 1984
 Dictyophara sauropsis Walker, 1862
 Dictyophara seladonica Melichar, 1912
 Dictyophara sindensis Shakila, 1984
 Dictyophara sordida Jensen-Haarup, 1920
 Dictyophara spinosa Shakila, 1984
 Dictyophara spuria Stål, 1859
 Dictyophara sumatrana Lallemand, 1931
 Dictyophara vishneviensis† (Becker-Migdisova, 1964)
 Dictyophara zeae Shakila, 1984

References

External links

Dictyopharidae
Auchenorrhyncha genera
Taxa named by Ernst Friedrich Germar